Nemili is a Taluk in Ranipet district of Tamil Nadu state, announced on 31 August 2015 by Tamil Nadu Chief minister Selvi J.Jayalalitha.  This city, before becoming a separate taluk, it was a town panchyat under Arakkonam Taluk .This town is located in the Ranipet district about 72 kilometres from the state capital of Chennai. Nemili is supposedly one of the hottest towns in Tamil Nadu, where the temperature can exceed 43 °C (110 °F) for several days in peak of the summer. People of all religions are living in the city . The major businesses are farming, hand loom and power looms.  Nemili itself is a panchayat town in Ranipet District in the Indian state of Tamil Nadu.

Demographics
 India census, Nemili had a population of 9382. Males constitute 51% of the population and females 49%. Nemili has an average literacy rate of 69%, higher than the national average of 59.5%: male literacy is 79%, and female literacy is 60%. In Nemili, 10% of the population is under 6 years of age.

Near by Police Station
Nemili Police Station, Near to Nemili Taluk Office and Near to Sandai Medu (Market)

Nemili Police Station Location

Near by cites
Railway Town - Arakkonam,
Town - Nemili,
District - Ranipet,
Nearest City: Vellore
Nearest Airport - Chennai (60 km),
Nearest Railway station - Arakkonam (15 km), Thirulmapur (6 km),
Banavaram (16 km),
Kanchipuram (24 km),
Sholingur (24 km),
Takkolam (15 km),
Kaveripakkam (20 km),
Vellore (70 km),
Ponnai (40 km)

Schools

1. Government Boys Higher Secondary School, Nemili
Govt Boys School Location

2. Government Girls Higher Secondary School, Nemili.

3. Dr.Natarajan Higher Secondary School, Nemili.

4. Vivekanandha Matric. Hr. Sec. School, Sayanapuram, Nemili

5. Dr. V.S.Isaac Matriculation School, Pinnavaram village 

6. Punnai Government School, Punnai.

7. Sakthi Nursery School, Nemili.

8. Kariyakudal govt primary school, kariyakudal

Hospitals
 Government Hospital, punnai near nemili.
 Government Veterinary Hospital, nemili.
 Dr. natarajan Hospital, nemili.
 Vishnu Clinic.
 Ramadas Clinic.
 Lakshmi Hospital 24 Hrs Care.
 Ashivin lab technology .
 Sri Ganapathy clinic -both general and dental hospital Newly open at old post office building, Anna salai .

Colleges
 Dr. V.S.Isaac College Of Education (Co-Ed), Kancheepuram to Arakkonam Highway, Attupakkam village, Nemili.
 Dr.V.S.Isaac Teacher Training Institute (Co-Ed), KAnchipuram to Arakkonam Highway, Attupakkam village, Nemili
 Christian Teacher Training Institute (Co-Ed), Kanchipuram to Arakkonam Highway, Attupakkam village, Nemili
 Government Arts and Science College (Both Men/women's), Nemili to Senthamangalam Road, Attupakkam Village, Nemili.
 Ranjith ITI college, Banavaram Road, Punnai Village.

Temples

Arulmigu Sri Angalaparameshwari Amman Kovil nemili village.

 Sri PunnaKesvarr Swamy and Arulmigu visalakshi ambal sametha, Nemili.Eshwaran Kovil                                                                                             
 Arulmigu visalakshi ambal sametha Viswanatheeswarar thirukkoil , Asanallikuppam village , Nemili.
 Dhroubathi Amman koil , Asanallikuppam village , Nemili.                                               
 Srinivaasa perumal koil , Nemili.Shri Perumal Temple
Bala Thiripura Sundari Kovil, Nemili.
 Ponniamman Kovil, Nemili.Shri Ponni Amman Temple
 Eshwaran Kovil, Nemili.
 Verapatherar Kovil, Nemili.
 Sri Mariyamman Kovil, Nemili.அருள்மிகு மாரியம்மன் திருக்கோவில்
 sri kaliyamman, vettangulam.
 Dhroubathi Amman koil pannapakkam road nemili.Thiropathai Amman
Arunachalaswamy siddhar peedam kaveripuram.nemili

Bus Facility
 Every 15 mins once Government and private bus facilities Available from Arakkonam, Thiruttani to Vellore, via Nemili.
 Every 60 mins once Government and private bus facilities Available from kanchipuram and Nemili to Sholinger, via Banavaram.

Share Autos
 Every 15 mins Once share autos available from 
 Nemili to Santhamangalam.   
 Nemili to Pannapakam.   
 Nemili to Banavaram.
 Nemili to Arakkonam.

Gas Agency
 Harshitha Indane Gas Agency, SNO 198/4.Anna Salai, Banavaram Road, Nemili town, Vellore District
 S.R.S Indane Gas Agency, No.210, Mayura complex, ocheri road, Panapakkam. Ph:04177-252357,252457,9487245257

See also
Vettangulam

References

Ranipet district